DWRT could refer to:
Doctor Who Restoration Team
DWRT-FM, currently branded as 99.5 Play FM, an FM radio station in Metro Manila, Philippines
DWRT-AM, formerly known as Rock 990/Nueve Noventa, an AM radio station in Metro Manila, Philippines